New Jalpaiguri–Alipurduar Tourist Special is the tourist special Express trains in India that runs between New Jalpaiguri Junction and Alipurduar Junction in the Indian state of West Bengal. The train belongs to the Northeast Frontier Railway zone of Indian Railways. The service was officially started from 28 August 2021 from New Jalpaiguri. The train provides awesome sceneries of the beautiful Dooars region which includes Mahananda Wildlife Sanctuary, Sevoke Railway Bridge, River Teesta, River Jaldhaka, River Torsha, Dooars-Terai tea gardens,  Buxa Tiger Reserve, Jaldapara National Park, Chapramari Wildlife Sanctuary, Rajabhatkhawa, etc. The passengers travelling by this train would also get to see the mesmerizing view of Sub-Himalayas, the glaciated rivers such as Teesta, Torsha, Daina river, Jaldhaka , Kuji Daina, Dima river, etc. The train will also cover many little villages, towns, etc. One of this train's stoppage is Hasimara Railway Station, which lies near the border of Bhutan. The passengers would also get to see views of Jayanti Hills, Sevoke,  Chalsa, Terai–Duar savanna and grasslands and Malbazar. The passengers would also be entertained by dance performed by locals at some specific stations like Chalsa and Hasimara. There is also a selfie point in the Vistadome Coach. The train will cover three districts, which are Jalpaiguri District , Darjeeling District and Alipurduar District.

Locomotive

Coach Composition
15777/15778 Alipurduar - New Jalpaiguri /New Jalpaiguri - Alipurduar Tourist Express consists of Two General Class (GS) coaches, One AC Chair Car (CC) coach, One Executive Vistadome (EC) class, WDP-4/WDP-4D/WDP-4B Engine and One End On Generator (EOG) coach.

Stops
 New Jalpaiguri (Starts) [15777]
 Siliguri Junction
 Sevoke Junction
 New Malbazar Junction
 Chalsa Railway Station
 Madarihat Railway Station
 Hasimara Railway Station
 Rajabhatkhawa Railway Station
 Alipurduar Junction (Ends) [15778]

See also
Siliguri Junction–Rangtong–Siliguri Evening Safari

References

Tourist attractions in West Bengal
Express trains in India
2021 establishments in West Bengal
Northeast Frontier Railway zone
Rail transport in West Bengal
Transport in Siliguri
Alipurduar railway division